Technological University of Tajikistan is a Tajik university in Dushanbe (Str. Negmat Karabaev 63/3), with a focus on light and food industries, information technology and economics: specifically in marketing and international economic relations.

It was established on the basis of the Tajik Higher College of Technology, organized by the Council of Ministers of the Republic on September 20, 1990.

Academics 
The university offers 33 Bachelors, 8 Masters, and 6 Doctoral degrees.

The Technological University of Tajikistan consists of nine faculties and 19 departments:

Faculty of Engineering and Technology
Departments:
Chemistry
Technology of food production
Machinery and Equipment for food production.
Specialties:
1-54 01 01 05 – Metrology, standardization and certification (food)
1-36 09 01 01 – Equipment food-processing industries
1-91 01 01 01 – Production technology and catering organization
1-49 01 01 01 – Technology of grain storage and processing
1-49 01 01 02 – Technology of production of flour, pasta, confectionery and food concentrates
1-49 01 01 03 – Technology of preservation
1-49 01 01 04 – Technology of fermenting and wine
1-49 01 02 01 – Technology of meat and meat products
1-49 01 02 02 –Technology of milk and dairy products

Faculty of Technology and Design
Departments:
Physics and Mechanical Engineering
Art and design, history of applied arts
Technical management and quality management
Technology of textile and clothing design
Specialties:
1-50 01 01 01 – Spinning natural fibers
1-50 01 01 04 – Technology of cloth
1-50 01 02 01 – Technology of garments
1-50 01 02 02 – Designing garments
1-54 01 01 04 – Metrology, Standardization and Certification (Light Industry)
1-19 01 01 05 – Design (costume and fabric)

Faculty of innovation and computer technologies
Departments:
Higher Mathematics and Computer Science
Programming and protection of information systems
Specialties:
1-40 01 01 04 – Security System Data
1-40 01 01 07 – Mathematical and software automated production

Faculty of Finance and Innovation Management
Departments:
Economic theory
Finance and credit
Innovative Economics and Management
Specialties:
1-25 01 04 10 – Finance Management
1-25 01 07 03 – Business Administration
1-25 01 07 07 – Project Management

Faculty of Information Systems and Technology
Departments:
The State language, and culture of communication
Information Systems
Specialties:
1-40 01 02 02 – Information Systems and Technologies (in economics)

Faculty of Management and European Model of Education
Departments:
Foreign Languages
Management

Faculty of Joint Tajik-Ukrainian

Faculty of Joint Tajik-Russian

Faculty of World Economy and Marketing

Universities in Tajikistan
Education in Dushanbe
1990 establishments in Tajikistan
Educational institutions established in 1990